In electromagnetism, electromagnetic waves in vacuum travel at the speed of light c, according to Maxwell's Equations. The retarded time is the time when the field began to propagate from the point where it was emitted to an observer. The term "retarded" is used in this context (and the literature) in the sense of propagation delays.

Retarded and advanced times

The calculation of the retarded time tr or t′ is nothing more than a simple "speed-distance-time" calculation for EM fields.

If the EM field is radiated at position vector r′ (within the source charge distribution), and an observer at position r measures the EM field at time t, the time delay for the field to travel from the charge distribution to the observer is |r − r′|/c, so subtracting this delay from the observer's time t gives the time when the field actually began to propagate - the retarded time, t′.

The retarded time is:

which can be rearranged to

showing how the positions and times correspond to source and observer.

Another related concept is the advanced time ta, which takes the same mathematical form as above, but with a “+” instead of a “−”:

and is so-called since this is the time the field will advance from the present time t. Corresponding to retarded and advanced times are retarded and advanced potentials.

Retarded position 

The retarded position can be obtained from the current position of a particle by subtracting the distance it has travelled in the lapse from the retarded time to the current time.
For an inertial particle, this position can be obtained by solving this equation:

,

where rc is the current position of the source charge distribution and v its velocity.

Application

Perhaps surprisingly - electromagnetic fields and forces acting on charges depend on their history, not their mutual separation. The calculation of the electromagnetic fields at a present time includes integrals of charge density ρ(r', tr) and current density J(r', tr'') using the retarded times and source positions. The quantity is prominent in electrodynamics, electromagnetic radiation theory, and in Wheeler–Feynman absorber theory, since the history of the charge distribution affects the fields at later times.

See also
Antenna measurement
Electromagnetic four-potential
Jefimenko's equations
Liénard–Wiechert potential
Light-time correction

References

Time
Electromagnetic radiation